To begin a highly touted year, the 2007 Tennessee Volunteers basketball team traveled to Europe and played a few European teams going 4–1 against them. The Vols were hurt when Sophomore F Duke Crews was suspended. Crews suffered a 30-day suspension, but missed both exhibition games with an ankle injury. UT's first exb. game was against the California-Pennsylvania Vulcans, winning handily, 106–46. The University of Tennessee lead the SEC in unrelated Smiths (JaJaun, Tyler, and Ramar). Crews also missed  about a month due to heart problems. The Vols finished 31–5, winning the SEC regular season championship, for the first time since 2000. But the Vols lost in the 3rd round of both the SEC and NCAA Tournament.

Roster

Legend: C = Team Captain

Non-Scholarship Players                
Steven Pearl,     
Quinn Cannington,   
Tanner Wild,    
Rick Daniels-Mulholland,  
Justin Jackson, 
Brett Jackson

Coaches                 
Head Coach: Bruce Pearl,
Associate Coach: Tony Jones,
Assistant Coach: Steve Forbes,
Assistant Coach: Jason Shay,
Director of Basketball Operations: Ken Johnson

Schedule and results

|-
!colspan=9 style="background:#F77F00; color:white;"| Exhibition

|-
!colspan=9 style="background:#F77F00; color:white;"| Non-conference regular season

|-
!colspan=9 style="background:#F77F00; color:white;"| SEC regular season

|-
!colspan=9 style="background:#F77F00;"| SEC Tournament

|-
!colspan=9 style="background:#F77F00;"| NCAA tournament

References

Tennessee Volunteers basketball seasons
Tennessee
Tennessee
Volunteers
Volunteers